Bidar Air Force Station is a flight training establishment of the Indian Air Force. It was founded during World War II and has been a training center for Indian Air Force pilots since 1963. Trainer aircraft like the HAL HT-2 and variants of HAL HJT-16 Kiran have been used at the airbase for nearly four decades. In 2011, the station was remodeled and refurbished, with the runway extended to 9000 feet and new facilities for aircraft engine maintenance and testing added.

Bidar Air Force Station is home to the second biggest training center in India, providing further training to graduates of the Indian Air Force Academy before they are assigned to combat units. 60-90 sorties per day are flown from the base, generating the highest number of single-engine flying hours in India.

Once the home base for the air force's No. 52 Squadron, the station now houses the three Hawk Operational Training Squadrons (HOTS-A Aggressors, HOTS-B Bravehearts, and HOTS-C Cheetahs). A fourth squadron is ready to be raised shortly. The Weapon System Operators' School also functions here.

Location

Bidar is located in Karnataka, India. Its location on the Deccan Plateau provides protection from the tropical conditions that are experienced on the coast and favorable year-round flying conditions, allowing even non-instrument rated trainees to fly for most of the year.

Surya Kiran Aerobatic Team

The Indian air force's Surya Kiran Aerobatic Team (SKAT) flew its first six aircraft formation sortie on May 27, 1996 from the Bidar Air Force Station. Unlike other aerobatic teams, which fly either frontline fighter aircraft or advanced jet trainers, SKAT flies the Kiran MK II indigenous basic jet trainer. The team was suspended in February 2011 and was re-established with Hawk Mk-132 aircraft in 2017.

History
The Formation Aerobatic Team has been associated with Bidar AFS since 1990 with the arrival of a four-aircraft team called the Formation Aerobatic Team from Thunderbolts, which used Hawker Hunter fighters. The SKAT was born in 1996 and developed over time. It was conferred with Squadron status in 2006.

Training
Pilots serving as Qualified Flying Instructors (QFIs) with approximately 1,000 hours of experience on fighter aircraft can volunteer to be a part of the SKAT. Volunteers are invited to fly with the team, where their performance and personality traits are evaluated. Over a period of approximately 6 months, selected pilots then fly 70–75 sorties practising various manoeuvres before they are admitted to the formation flying team.

The average tenure of a SKAT pilot is about three years. Two new pilots join the team every six months. Starting at high altitude with a single aircraft sortie, with the team leader or the deputy team leader in the Kiran's left-hand seat, the trainee moves on to two-aircraft and then three-aircraft formation flying. After mastering the skill of flying with two aircraft on either side, the trainee then goes in for four-aircraft and six-aircraft sorties before finally graduating to nine-aircraft sorties. All types of rolls, loops, dives, and formations are flown at various training stages.

Composition
The team is led by a commanding officer who is also the leader of the formation during display sorties. The squad has 13 pilots, out of whom nine perform at any given time. Since their inception in 1996, these display aircraft have enthralled audiences with their maneuvers. Senior and experienced fighter pilots are chosen to be part of the prestigious SKAT, which uses the IAF's basic HJT-16 Kiran Mk-2 trainer aircraft. It has now used the Hawk Mk-132 aircraft since 2017.

Formations and Maneuvers
The most popular and also the most dangerous formation of the SKAT has been of the nine aircraft taking off in a V-shaped formation of three and joining up in close formation, maneuvering between speeds of 150 and 650 km per hour with their wing tips five metres apart.
Six Kiran trainer jets streak barely 50 metres above the ground in an arrowhead formation. With their wingtips separated by five metres, they move into a diamond formation and roll towards their left to form a "card" formation with three aircraft flying abreast and another three trailing just behind.
Reforming again after "synchro head-on cross", where two aircraft on the same level cross each other at a relative speed of 1100 km/h with a separation of just five metres, the brightly painted red and white aircraft, with their exhausts trailing smoke, dive vertically and then pull up again in different directions to simulate a bomb burst.

Training overview

Kiran Mk II

In July 2012, the final Kiran Mk II aircraft flew out of Bidar to the Tambaram Air Force Station. This aircraft had been in service at Bidar for almost three decades.

Hawk Mk 132

Flying training at Bidar is now done on the Hawk Mk 132 aircraft. The Hawk brings a step-up in capability as a training aircraft, bridging the gap between the basic piston-engined trainer and the high-performance flying of an advanced fighter aircraft. It is aerodynamically much more forgiving and is an introduction for trainee pilots to familiarise on before they go into fighters.

The Stage-III training, ahead of the pilots graduating to the supersonic jets such as MiG-21s, Jaguars, Mirages and Sukhoi SU-30MKIs is carried out at Bidar.

Accidents
On March 18, 2006, Wing Commander Dheeraj Bhatia and Squadron Leader Shailendra Singh were killed while flying the Kiran aircraft. This was the first-ever crash involving a Surya Kiran team.
on January 21, 2009, an Indian Air Force Kiran on a routine practise session crashed near Bidar, killing Wing Commander Daliwal. This was the second fatal Surya Kiran air mishap.

Distinguished Officers
Flight Lieutenant Rajika Sharma of the Station was the first woman officer of the Indian Air Force to scale Mount Everest. She was a MET officer posted to the station when she achieved this distinction.
Air Marshal Ramesh Rai commanded the Bidar Air Force Station, and the Advance HQ at Kolkata. The HAWK advanced jet trainers (AJT) were inducted during his tenure at Bidar, wherein he pioneered the training system for the AJT. He served as the Chief of Central Air Command before taking over as AOC-in-C, Training Command.
Air Marshal Paramjit Singh Gill AVSM VM, Senior Air Staff Officer (SASO) of WAC, was Chief Instructor (CI) at Air Force Stn Bidar.
Air Marshal VR Iyer, Air Officer in Charge of Personnel at Air HQ, being a qualified flying instructor, has imparted training at Air Force Station Bidar.
The AFS Bidar was commanded by Air Chief Marshal PV Naik VSM ADC.

Galleries

References

Bidar
Indian Air Force
Indian Air Force bases